Cathrine Buccat Graversen (born April 25, 1998) is a footballer who plays as a defender or a midfielder. She last played for Elitettan club IK Uppsala. Born in Denmark, she represents the Philippines women's national team.

Career

Youth
Graversen had her youth career at Vipperød Boldklub, Ballerup-Skovlunde and Kolding.

Ballerup-Skovlunde
In 2018, Graversen returned to Ballerup-Skovlunde. She made her debut for the club in a 5–0 defeat against Brøndby, coming in as a substitute replacing Isabell Nederby in the 78th minute.

B.93 Pigefodbold
Graversen joined B.93 Pigefodbold in the spring of 2019.

Return to Ballerup-Skovlunde
After a short stint with B.93, she returned to Ballerup-Skovlunde.

Calcio Pomigliano
In October 2020, Graversen joined Italian Serie B club Calcio Pomigliano.

Return to B.93 Pigefodbold
Five months later, Graversen returned to B.93.

Nea Salamis
In the summer of 2021, Graversen joined Cypriot First Division club Nea Salamis.

IK Uppsala
In 2022, it was announced that Graversen joined Elitettan club IK Uppsala.

International career
Born in Denmark, Graversen is eligible to represent either Denmark or the Philippines at international level.

Philippines
As early as 2017, Graversen was invited for a national team training camp in California. However, one month before the training camp, she caught a concussion which prevented her from joining the camp. Two years later, Graversen made her debut for the Philippines in a 11–0 friendly win against Macau.

In 2019, Graversen was one of the 20 players that were called up for the 2019 Southeast Asian Games held in Manila.

References

External links

 

1998 births
Living people
Citizens of the Philippines through descent
Danish women's footballers
Filipino women's footballers
Women's association football defenders
Women's association football midfielders
Philippines women's international footballers
Filipino expatriate footballers
Filipino expatriate sportspeople in Denmark
Filipino expatriate sportspeople in Italy
Expatriate women's footballers in Italy
Expatriate women's footballers in Cyprus
Filipino people of Danish descent
Competitors at the 2019 Southeast Asian Games
Southeast Asian Games competitors for the Philippines